The Billbach is a right-hand tributary of the Mud in Bavaria's Odenwald forest. It begins at the confluence of the Marsbach and Morre west of Schneeberg. Both headstreams rise in the state of Baden-Württemberg.

Geography

Headstreams

Marsbach 

The Marsbach or Morsbach rises southeast of Walldürn in the vicinity of the historic Roman thermae. It flows in a northwesterly direction through Walldürn parallel to the B 47 to Rippberg, where it collects the Eiderbach. The Marsbach then crosses the state border into Bavaria. It is the 16.4 kilometres long and thus the shorter and small headstream.

Morre 

The 22-kilometre-long Morre, also called the Saubach in its Bavarian lower reaches, has its source on the edge of the village of Hettingen. It runs westwards through the borough of Buchen, bends towards the northwest and collects the Hollerbach. The Morre flows through Hettigenbeuern into Bavaria and reaches Zittenfelden. West of  Schneeberg it the Morre unites with the Marsbach to form the Billbach.

Course 
After the confluence of its headstreams, the Billbach crosses under the B 47 and flows through Amorbach. At the northwestern edge of the town it empties into the 25-kilometre-long Mud at the start of the B 469.

External links 

 Widening of the Billbach

References 

Rivers of Bavaria
Miltenberg (district)
Odenwald
Tributaries of the Mud
Rivers of Germany